Mirza Hasan Ali (1835 – October 1893) also known by his title Nasir ol-Molk was an aristocrat from the Qavam family who patronaged the Nasir-ol-Molk Mosque.

Hassan Ali was the youngest son of Ali Akbar Qavam ol-Molk, kalantar (lord mayor) of Shiraz. he for the most of his life, would travel around Iran, so that he missed the death and funeral of his father and was not aware of that until much later. upon his return to Shiraz in 1869, he oathed to himself to build a tomb suitable for his father and bury him there, thus he started to gather money and from 1876 to 1888 constructed the Nasir-ol-Molk Mosque.

Early life 
Ali's father, Ali Akbar was one of the most influential indivituals of the 19th-century Shiraz. close to Ali's birth, his father involved with a dispute with the governor of Fars, prince Hossein Ali Mirza, in which the governor wanted to claim the throne from Mohammad Mirza and Ali Akbar was against it. Hossein Ali Mirza imprisoned Fath-Ali, Ali Akbar's eldest son and Ali's brother, Ali Akbar to secure his and his wife's safety, went to Isfahan, where Ali was born.

After the fall of Hossein Ali Mirza, Ali Akbar with his family returned to Shiraz. in 1843, Ali was sent to his cousin, Mirza Abolhassan Khan Ilchi, to be under his tutoring although two years later with Ilchi's death, he had to return. after that Ali started to travel throughout Iran. in 1858 at Mazandaran, he accidentally met with Naser al-Din Shah, there the Shah bestowed him the title of Nasir ol-Molk. meanwhile, Ali's brother, Fath-Ali Khan died in Tehran. Ali Akbar left Shiraz for Tehran and since Ali was far from the city, he appointed his daughter, Zinat al-Moluk as the kalantar. Ali was not pleased with the decision however when he realised that his sister could withstand and run the city like his father, he silenced his objection.

The Mosque 
In 1865, Ali Akbar died in Mashhad and was buried in Shiraz, while Ali was in Tehran. he returned in 1869 and was devastated by his father's death. Ali decided to build a tomb for his father so that he could be buried in a suitable place. thus began his work on gathering money. his sister, Zinat al-Moluk, provided a significant amount of budget. with that, Ali was able to buy a plot of land in front of the tomb of Saadi, his father's favourite poet. at this time, however, Mass'oud Mirza Zell-e Soltan was appointed as the governor of Fars and banned any construction without his permission. Zell-e Soltan's decree was not received well by either the kalantar or the people. Zinat al-Moluk in fact, led a revolt against the governor that stopped Ali from hiring any worker or further increasing his budget.

While the conflicts were ongoing in Shiraz, Ali in 1872, married with Forough al-Molk, a daughter of Ardashir Khan, of Bakhtiari tribe, known for her beauty. Zinat al-Moluk for the new couple, built the Forough al-Molk House which is in neighbouring of Tomb of Bibi Dokhtaran located in the north of Shiraz. his son, Ismail, was born a year later. in 1876, when Zell-e Soltan was removed from the governorship, Ali could start his project. the building of the mosque lasted for twelve years and was completed in 1888. in the same year Ali moved his father's remains to the new mosque and buried him there. from then, the mosque became Qavam family's burial site as many of the members were buried there. Mirza Hasan Ali Nasir ol-Molk died in October 1893 and according to his will was buried alongside his father.

References

Bibliography 

Qavam family
1835 births
1893 deaths
People from Isfahan
People of Qajar Iran
19th-century Iranian people